Farmington Township may refer to:

Arkansas
 Farmington Township, Washington County, Arkansas

Illinois
 Farmington Township, Fulton County, Illinois

Iowa
 Farmington Township, Cedar County, Iowa
 Farmington Township, Van Buren County, Iowa

Kansas
 Farmington Township, Republic County, Kansas, in Republic County, Kansas
 Farmington Township, Stafford County, Kansas, in Stafford County, Kansas
 Farmington Township, Washington County, Kansas, in Washington County, Kansas

Michigan
 Farmington Township, Michigan, now the city of Farmington Hills

Minnesota
 Farmington Township, Olmsted County, Minnesota

North Dakota
 Farmington Township, Walsh County, North Dakota

Ohio
 Farmington Township, Trumbull County, Ohio

Pennsylvania
 Farmington Township, Clarion County, Pennsylvania
 Farmington Township, Tioga County, Pennsylvania
 Farmington Township, Warren County, Pennsylvania

South Dakota
 Farmington Township, Day County, South Dakota, in Day County, South Dakota
 Farmington Township, Grant County, South Dakota, in Grant County, South Dakota
 Farmington Township, Lake County, South Dakota, in Lake County, South Dakota

Township name disambiguation pages